Cornelius Cronin (March 10, 1838 – August 18, 1912) was a sailor in the United States Navy who received the Medal of Honor for his actions during the American Civil War.

Biography
Cornelius Cronin was born in Detroit, Michigan. He enlisted in the Navy on September 17, 1858.

Chief Gunner Cronin died on August 18, 1912, at Brooklyn, New York.

Cronin was a companion of the Naval Order of the United States.

Medal of Honor citation
Rank and organization: Chief Quartermaster, U.S. Navy. Born: 1836, Michigan. Accredited to: Michigan. G.O. No.: 45, 31 December 1864.

Citation:

On board the U.S.S. Richmond in action at Mobile Bay on 5 August 1864. Cool and vigilant at his station throughout the prolonged action, Cronin watched for signals and skillfully steered the ship as she trained her guns on Fort Morgan and on ships of the Confederacy despite extremely heavy return fire. He participated in the actions at Forts Jackson and St. Philip, with the Chalmette batteries, at the surrender of New Orleans, and in the attacks on batteries below Vicksburg.

Namesake
During World War II, two destroyer escorts were named  in his honor.

See also

List of American Civil War Medal of Honor recipients: A–F

References

1838 births
1912 deaths
Burials at Calvary Cemetery (Queens)
United States Navy Medal of Honor recipients
People of Michigan in the American Civil War
Union Navy sailors
United States Navy sailors
American Civil War recipients of the Medal of Honor